Lowland was a  cargo ship that was built in 1944 as Kattenturm by Deutsche Werft, Hamburg, Germany for Deutsche Dampfschiffahrts-Gesellschaft Hansa, Bremen (DDG Hansa). She was seized as a prize of war in 1945, passed to the Ministry of War Transport (MoWT) and renamed Empire Eden. In 1947, she was sold into merchant service and renamed Lowland. A sale to a Bermudan owner in 1959 saw her renamed Mary Enid. She was sold to a Greek owner in 1963 and renamed Stelianos and then Marynik following another sale in 1964. In 1967, she was sold to Hong Kong and renamed Euphipides, serving until she was scrapped in 1969.

Description
The ship was built in 1944 by Deutsche Werft, Hamburg.

The ship was propelled by a Type LES 9 compound steam engine. The engine was built by Rheinmetall-Borsig AG, Berlin. The ship was equipped with a 30-ton, a 10-ton and ten 5-ton derricks.

History
Kattenturms keel was laid down on 2 October 1943. She was launched on 18 January 1944 and delivered to DDG Hansa on 16 March. The Code Letters DOXZ were allocated. She carried a crew of 25, plus eight or ten gunners. On 1 May 1945, she was seized by British forces at Brunsbüttel, Germany as a prize of war, notification of which was given on 18 March 1946. She was passed to the MoWT, which later became the Ministry of Transport. On 5 June 1945, she was delivered to Methil, Fife. Kattenturm was initially operated under the management of the China Navigation Co Ltd. She was later placed under the management of Currie Line Ltd, Leith, East Lothian. In 1946, she was renamed Empire Eden. The United Kingdom Official Number 180640 and Code Letters GMJG were allocated. Her port of registry was London. On 8 December, Empire Eden ran aground at Spurn Head, Yorkshire in a gale, but was refloated. In 1947, Empire Eden was sold to her managers and was renamed Lowland.

In 1959, Lowland was sold to the Poseidon Shipping Co, Hamilton, Bermuda and was renamed Mary Enid, remaining under the British flag. In 1963, she was sold to the Delphic Shipping Co, Piraeus, Greece and renamed Stelianos. A sale in 1964 to Marynik Compagnia Navigazione, Monrovia, Liberia saw her renamed Marynik.  In 1967, she was sold to P D Marchessini (Far East) Ltd, Hong Kong and renamed Euripides. She was operated under the management of the Euripides Shipping Co, Hong Kong. She served until July 1969, when she was scrapped arrived on 8 February at Hong Kong for scrapping by Ming, Kee & Co.

References

1944 ships
Ships built in Hamburg
Cargo ships of Germany
World War II merchant ships of Germany
Steamships of Germany
Empire ships
Ministry of War Transport ships
Steamships of the United Kingdom
Cargo ships of the United Kingdom
Maritime incidents in 1946
Steamships of Greece
Cargo ships of Greece
Steamships of Liberia
Cargo ships of Liberia
Steamships of Panama
Merchant ships of Panama